Lago del Segrino is a lake in the Province of Como, Lombardy, Italy. At an elevation of 374 m, its surface area is 0.35 km².

Lakes of Lombardy